75 (seventy-five) is the natural number following 74 and preceding 76.



In mathematics
75 is a self number because there is no integer that added up to its own digits adds up to 75. It is the sum of the first five pentagonal numbers, and therefore a pentagonal pyramidal number, as well as a nonagonal number.

It is also the fourth ordered Bell number, and a Keith number, because it recurs in a Fibonacci-like sequence started from its base 10 digits: 7, 5, 12, 17, 29, 46, 75...

75 is the count of the number of weak orderings on a set of four items.

Excluding the infinite sets, there are 75 uniform polyhedra in the third dimension, which incorporate star polyhedra as well. Inclusive of 7 families of prisms and antiprisms, there are also 75 uniform compound polyhedra.

In other fields

Seventy-five is:

The atomic number of rhenium
The age limit for Canadian senators
A common name for the Canon de 75 modèle 1897, a French World War I gun
The department number of the city of Paris
The number of balls in a standard game of Bingo in the United States

References

Integers